James Alix Michel, GCSK  (born August 16, 1944) is a Seychellois politician and the former President of Seychelles from year 2004 to 2016. He previously served as Vice-President under his predecessor, France-Albert René, from 1996 to 2004. 

Michel was initially a teacher, but later he became involved in the archipelago's booming tourism industry and joined René's political party before independence in 1976.

Life and career
Michel followed President René through different political posts during all periods of the Seychelles' history as an independent entity. He was a member of the Executive Committee of the Seychelles People's United Party from 1974 to 1977; subsequently, when the party was transformed into the Seychelles People's Progressive Front (SPPF), he became a member of its Central Executive Committee. René staged a coup against the country's first President, James Mancham, only one year after independence, and Michel was appointed Minister of Public Administration and Information in June 1977. During the 1977–1993 one-party socialist rule, Michel held various ruling party and ministerial portfolios, such as Minister of Finance from 1989 to 2006. In 1984 he became the SPPF's Deputy Secretary-General, and in 1994 he became its secretary-general.

During the rule of President René, Michel was the head of the Seychellois economy on several occasions. In these 27 years, the Seychelles experienced a period of economic growth based on its tourism and fishery sectors, which was followed by stagnation in the 1990s. Starting from 2008, Michel has presided over a macro-economic reform program, leading to a massive reduction in budget deficit and complete liberalization of foreign exchange transactions.

Michel also played a major role in the country's democratisation process, which started with multi-party elections in 1993. However, according to the opposition, Seychelles still suffers from limited freedom and transparency of the press and rigged election, although all elections held since have been certified free and fair by international observers. According to official results, President René and his Seychelles People's Progressive Front party won presidential and legislative elections in 2001 and 2002 respectively, with about 54% of the vote in both cases.

After retiring from politics in 2016, Michel created the James Michel Foundation to fund and support projects that focus on blue economy and climate change.

Presidency

After serving as Vice-President for nearly eight years, beginning in August 1996, Michel became President on 14 July 2004, when René stepped down. At that point, Michel was René's longest-serving cabinet minister. As President, he held the portfolios of Defence, Police, Information, and Risk & Disaster Management.

Seychelles' opposition leader, Wavel Ramkalawan, expressed increased concern over the declining trends in the national economy and demanded more dialogue with the ruling party. The leader of the Seychelles National Party furthermore said that he would be cooperating with President Michel.

Michel won the presidential election held on 28–30 July 2006, taking 53.7% of the vote. He was sworn in for his new term on 1 August 2006. Michel won re-election in May 2011, receiving 55.4% of the vote. He was sworn in for his new term of office on 22 May 2011.

In early 2015, Michel confirmed that he planned to run for a third term in the next presidential election. Reflecting on his time in office, he said: "I worked hard, I did everything for Seychelles [and] the Seychellois people and I feel that people appreciate my work." His term was scheduled to end in 2016, but he announced on 1 October 2015 that the next election would be held a few months earlier. The date was subsequently set for 3–5 December 2015. He very narrowly defeated Ramkalawan in a run-off by a margin of less than 200 votes.

Michel announced on 27 September 2016 that he was resigning, effective 16 October, and handing over power to Vice President Danny Faure, less than a year into his third term. The decision coincided with the election of an opposition majority in the National Assembly in the September 2016 parliamentary election. Michel said that "a new generation of Parti Lepep will take Seychelles to the next frontier of its development" and that he felt "a sense of mission accomplished".

2015 Cabinet

Awards and decorations
:
 Grand Commander of the Order of the Star and Key of the Indian Ocean (2012)
:
 Grand Cross Special Class of the Order pro Merito Melitensi (2010)

References

|-

1944 births
Finance Ministers of Seychelles
Foreign Ministers of Seychelles
Grand Commanders of the Order of the Star and Key of the Indian Ocean
Recipients of the Order pro Merito Melitensi
Living people
United Seychelles Party politicians
Presidents of Seychelles
University of Seychelles
Vice-presidents of Seychelles
People from Mahé, Seychelles